Gildersleeve is a surname. Notable people with the surname include:

 Basil Lanneau Gildersleeve (1831–1924), American classical scholar
 Charles Fuller Gildersleeve (1833–1906)
 Henry Alger Gildersleeve (1840-1923) American jurist
 John Gildersleeve (born 1944), British businessman
 Overton Smith Gildersleeve (1825–1864)
 Sarah Gildersleeve Fife (1885–1949), American bibliophile, gardener
 Virginia Gildersleeve (1877–1965), American academic, long-time Dean of Barnard College
 Willard Gildersleeve (1886–1976), head coach of New Hampshire's football team in 1909 and Massachusetts' team in 1910
 William Camp Gildersleeve (1795–1871), American abolitionist

See also
Andrew Gildersleeve Octagonal Building, historic octagonal house in Mattituck, New York
Gildersleeve House in Hudson, McLean County, Illinois, US
Gildersleeve Mountain in Kirtland, Ohio, US
The Great Gildersleeve (1941–1957), US radio comedy show, one of broadcast history's earliest spin-off programs